United Nations Security Council resolution 895, adopted unanimously on 28 January 1994, after recalling previous resolutions on Israel and Lebanon including 501 (1982), 508 (1982), 509 (1982) and 520 (1982) as well as studying the report by the Secretary-General Boutros Boutros-Ghali on the United Nations Interim Force in Lebanon (UNIFIL) approved in 426 (1978), the Council decided to extend the mandate of UNIFIL for a further six months until 31 July 1994.

The Council then reemphasised the mandate of the Force and requested the Secretary-General Boutros Boutros-Ghali to report back on the progress made with regard to the implementation of resolutions 425 (1978) and 426 (1978).

See also 
 List of United Nations Security Council Resolutions 801 to 900 (1993–1994)
 South Lebanon conflict (1985–2000)

References

External links
 
Text of the Resolution at undocs.org

 0895
 0895
1994 in Israel
1994 in Lebanon
 0895
January 1994 events